In statistics, the residence time is the average amount of time it takes for a random process to reach a certain boundary value, usually a boundary far from the mean.

Definition

where "inf" is the infimum. This is the smallest time after the initial time  that  is equal to one of the critical values forming the boundary of the interval, assuming  is within the interval.

Because  proceeds randomly from its initial value to the boundary,  is itself a random variable.

For a Gaussian process and a boundary far from the mean, the residence time equals the inverse of the frequency of exceedance of the smaller critical value,

where the frequency of exceedance  is

 is the variance of the Gaussian distribution,

Generalization to multiple dimensions

Define a domain  that contains  and has a smooth boundary .

The mean of this time is the residence time,

Logarithmic residence time

The logarithmic residence time is a dimensionless variation of the residence time. It is proportional to the natural log of a normalized residence time. Noting the exponential in Equation , the logarithmic residence time of a Gaussian process is defined as

This is closely related to another dimensionless descriptor of this system, the number of standard deviations between the boundary and the mean, .

In general, the normalization factor  can be difficult or impossible to compute, so the dimensionless quantities can be more useful in applications.

See also
 Cumulative frequency analysis
 Extreme value theory
 First-hitting-time model
 Frequency of exceedance
 Mean time between failures

Notes

References
 
 
 

Extreme value data
Survival analysis
Reliability analysis